Players and pairs who neither have high enough rankings nor receive wild cards may participate in a qualifying tournament held one week before the annual Wimbledon Tennis Championships.

Seeds

  Roberta Vinci (qualifying competition)
  Yuliana Fedak (first round)
  Sofia Arvidsson (qualifying competition)
  Sun Tiantian (qualified)
  Mashona Washington (qualified)
  Eva Birnerová (qualified)
  Virginie Razzano (qualified)
  Camille Pin (first round)
  Barbara Rittner (qualifying competition)
  Yuliya Beygelzimer (qualified)
  Stephanie Gehrlein (first round)
  Virginie Pichet (first round)
  Zuzana Ondrášková (second round)
  Tatiana Panova (qualified)
  Alexandra Stevenson (qualifying competition)
  Conchita Martínez Granados (first round)
  Mariana Díaz Oliva (first round)
  Kelly McCain (first round)
  Julia Schruff (second round)
  Adriana Serra Zanetti (second round)
  Angelique Widjaja (qualified)
  Yuka Yoshida (first round)
  Tzipora Obziler (qualifying competition)
  Lenka Němečková (first round)

Qualifiers

  Nuria Llagostera Vives
  Angelique Widjaja
  Tatiana Panova
  Sun Tiantian
  Mashona Washington
  Eva Birnerová
  Virginie Razzano
  Jennifer Hopkins
  Stéphanie Foretz
  Yuliya Beygelzimer
  Edina Gallovits
  Christina Wheeler

Qualifying draw

First qualifier

Second qualifier

Third qualifier

Fourth qualifier

Fifth qualifier

Sixth qualifier

Seventh qualifier

Eighth qualifier

Ninth qualifier

Tenth qualifier

Eleventh qualifier

Twelfth qualifier

External links

2004 Wimbledon Championships on WTAtennis.com
2004 Wimbledon Championships – Women's draws and results at the International Tennis Federation

Women's Singles Qualifying
Wimbledon Championship by year – Women's singles qualifying
Wimbledon Championships